Tapinoma orthocephalum is a species of ant in the genus Tapinoma. Described by Stitz in 1934, the species is endemic to Mongolia.

References

Tapinoma
Hymenoptera of Asia
Insects described in 1934